The AAU Junior Olympic Games are the pinnacle competitions held annually by the US Amateur Athletic Union.

Overview
The AAU Junior Olympic Games are known as the largest national multi-sport event for youth in the United States. It has become the showcase event of the AAU Sports Program. Recent hosts include Des Moines, Iowa; Greensboro, North Carolina; Hampton Roads, Virginia; Houston, Texas; and Detroit, Michigan in 2017.

The AAU is one of the largest, non-profit, volunteer sports organizations in the country. As a multi-sport organization, AAU is dedicated exclusively to the promotion and development of amateur sports and physical fitness programs. The AAU philosophy of “Sports for All, Forever” is shared by over 500,000 members and 60,000 volunteers nationwide. Over 34 sports are offered in the 57 AAU Districts. Programs offered by the AAU include AAU Sports Program, AAU Junior Olympic Games, AAU James E. Sullivan Memorial Award, and the AAU Complete Athlete Program.

The AAU was founded in 1888 to establish standards and uniformity in amateur sports. During its early years, the AAU served as a leader in international sports representing the United States in the international sports federations. The AAU worked closely with the Olympic movement to prepare athletes for the Olympic games. After the Amateur Sports Act of 1978 and the establishment of the United States Olympic Committee, the AAU has focused its efforts on providing sports programs for participants of all ages beginning at the grassroots level.

History
The AAU Junior Olympic Games originated from 'telegraphic' state track and field competitions. National Champions were determined through telephone and/or mail entries instead of head-to-head competition. In 1949, the AAU conducted its first 'live' national meet in Cleveland, Ohio — giving birth to the AAU Youth Sports Program. Because of the success of the national track and field head-to-head competition, AAU leaders solicited support from the business and corporate sectors. The Chevrolet Division of General Motors Corporation and the Quaker Oats Company assisted the AAU in their vision of the number of youngsters that could be helped.

As the popularity of the AAU Youth Sports Program increased, the AAU leaders decided to conduct two national championships simultaneously. The idea came to fruition when Vice-President Hubert H. Humphrey proclaimed the first AAU Junior Olympic Games open on August 21, 1967, in downtown Washington, D.C., at the Departmental Auditorium on Constitution Avenue. Five hundred twenty-three athletes competed in the inaugural AAU Junior Olympic Games that year. National champions were determined in swimming and track and field. Eighteen AAU records in swimming and three in track and field were established.

Since its beginning in Washington, D.C., the AAU Junior Olympic Games have been conducted in 19 states and 30 cities across the United States. The state of Tennessee leads the way with six AAU Junior Olympic Games to its credit. "There's nothing junior about it" has become the theme of the AAU Junior Olympic Games while growing to over 16,000 participants in over 20 sports. The Game's popularity has exploded to now represent all 50 states and several United States territories.

Sports currently held
The following is a list of sports that currently take place at the Junior Olympic Games.

Sports previously held 

Previously, a version of floor hockey whose rules were codified by Canada's Sam Jacks during the Great Depression in Toronto, Ontario, was a part of the games. In 1947, Jacks became the head coach of the Canadian Floor Hockey Team which competed in the AAU Junior Olympic Games in the USA where the Canadian team finished in third place. Two years later in 1949, the AAU conducted its first 'live' national meet in Cleveland, Ohio, giving birth to the AAU Youth Sports Program. Today the floor game is no longer a part of the Junior Games, but influenced the creation of a floor hockey variant which now exists as a part of the Special Olympics. Jacks would eventually go on to create the winter sport of ringette in 1963.

Bodybuilding
Bodybuilding was considered an appropriate sport to be judged in the AAU due to its focus and "good moral values to athletic youth." It is divided into four classes: Teen (ages 14–18), Collegiate (19-28), Women's, and Men's Natural. As of 2011, there has been no notice of how the sport's admission to the event line-up will be viewed by audiences.
Because the sport is not "athletic" in its competitive sense, contestants will have to do the following: do a posing routine with including the required poses in three stages (preliminary, solo, and final posedown), and they will have to submit a video essay on the sport and its effects on their lives, including nutrition, exercise, and the bodybuilding lifestyle.
It is important to note that the Teen Bodybuilding event will take place at a local high school to promote the sport among the youth and popularize it with worried parents.
Bodybuilders will be judged on the following: overall mass, symmetry, aesthetic presentation, posing routine, submitted video essay, and inquiry. Any contestant found to be using illegal substances will be automatically disqualified, without opportunity to qualify in future AAU events.

Locations

Dance/Drill Team event categories

Karate event categories 
 Kata
 Kumite
 Team Kumite
 Kobudo

See also
1988 Junior Olympics

References

External links
AAU national all-sports website
AAU national Athletics (track & field, cross country, and multi-events) website
AAU Jr. Olympic Games website
AAU South Texas District website
AAU 2008 Junior Olympics Coverage, An Official Partnership Between AAU and GoTrybe
AAU Official Partner - GoTrybe

Junior Olympic Games
Multi-sport events in the United States
National multi-sport events
Recurring sporting events established in 1967
Youth sport in the United States
National youth sports competitions